Tonya Evinger (born June 4, 1981) is an American mixed martial artist. A professional mixed martial artist since 2006, Evinger has previously competed for the  Ultimate Fighting Championship (UFC), EliteXC, Raging Wolf and Invicta Fighting Championships, and was the Invicta Bantamweight Champion.

Early life
Evinger played football and wrestled while at Odessa High School in Odessa, Missouri. She went on to wrestle and earn her degree at Missouri Valley College in Marshall, Missouri. Evinger's younger twin brothers, Chris and Owen Evinger, are also professional mixed martial arts fighters.

Mixed martial arts career

Early career
Evinger faced Jennifer Tate at IFC: Warriors Challenge 21 on June 3, 2006 and lost via triangle choke in the second round. The fight was the first women's bout ever sanctioned by the California State Athletic Commission.

She faced Brittany Pullen at FFF 1: Asian Invasion on February 17, 2007. She won the fight via a 16-second knockout in the first round.

Evinger faced Shonie Plagman at X-1: Extreme Fighting 2 on March 17, 2007. She won the fight by knockout 10 seconds into the second round.

She faced Ginele Marquez at Tuff-N-Uff 2 on April 14, 2007. She won the fight by rear naked choke submission in the third round.

Evinger faced Vanessa Porto at FFF 2: Girls Night Out on July 14, 2007. She lost the fight by armbar submission in the first round.

EliteXC
Evinger debuted for Elite XC against Gina Carano at EliteXC: Uprising on September 15, 2007. She lost the fight by rear-naked choke submission in the first round.

She faced Julie Kedzie at ShoXC: Elite Challenger Series on January 25, 2007. She won the fight by rear-naked choke submission in the first round.

Post-EliteXC
Evinger faced Alexis Davis at Raging Wolf 7: Mayhem In The Mist 3 on May 8, 2010 for the Raging Wolf Women's Flyweight Championship. She lost the fight by rear-naked choke submission in the third round.

Evinger faced Adrienna Jenkins in a number one contender's bout at Raging Wolf 8: Cage Supremacy on July 17, 2010. She won the fight by TKO in the second round.

On November 6, 2010, Evinger rematched Alexis Davis at Raging Wolf 10. She was defeated by submission due to a rear-naked choke in the first round.

Evinger faced Sara McMann at Titan Fighting Championships 19 on July 29, 2011 in Kansas City, Kansas. The fight served as the co-main event. Evinger was defeated by unanimous decision.

On September 23, 2011, Evinger stepped in on short notice to face Anita Rodriguez at XFL: Rumble on the River 5 in Tulsa, Oklahoma. She defeated Rodriguez by submission due to a rear-naked choke in round one.

Evinger defeated Lacie Jackson by knockout in the first round at Fight Me MMA on April 13, 2012.

On November 10, 2012, Evinger made her flyweight debut against Carina Damm at Fight Hard MMA. She defeated Damm by split decision.

The Ultimate Fighter
In August 2013, it was announced that Evinger was one of the fighters selected to be on The Ultimate Fighter: Team Rousey vs. Team Tate. In the elimination fight to get into the TUF house, Evinger faced Raquel Pennington and lost via guillotine choke submission in the second round.

Invicta Fighting Championships
On December 7, 2013, Evinger faced Sarah D'Alelio at Invicta Fighting Championships 7. She won the fight via unanimous decision.

After switching camps to Houston, Texas she joined team Gracie Barra Champions and 4 oz Fight Club, training her Boxing and Kickboxing with Aaron Pena (GBC) and MMA with Jeremy Mahon (4 oz). Evinger next fought Ediane Gomes at Invicta Fighting Championships 8 on September 6, 2014. She won the fight via first round submission.

Evinger next fought Cindy Dandois at Invicta Fighting Championships 10 on December 5, 2014. She won the fight via second round submission, making her the front runner to fight for the vacant Invicta FC bantamweight title.

Evinger next fought Irene Aldana for the vacant Invicta FC bantamweight title at Invicta Fighting Championships 13 on July 9, 2015. She dominated the fight from bell to bell, almost finishing the fight early with an arm bar. Evinger would go on to stop Aldana in the 4th round via TKO (punches), claiming the Invicta FC bantamweight title.

Evinger next fought undefeated prospect, Pannie Kianzad. This was originally set as a  title defense but both Evinger and Kianzad were unable to make weight, both being fined a percentage of their purse and was changed to a five-round non-title fight. Evinger ended up dispatching Kianzad in the 2nd round by TKO due to punches.

Evinger next fought Colleen Schneider at Invicta Fighting Championships 17 on May 7, 2016. Evinger successfully defended her bantamweight title by unanimous decision. Following the fight, Evinger celebrated her victory by kissing interviewer Laura Sanko on the lips.

Evinger would lose her bantamweight championship in an upset defeat to Russian newcomer Yana Kunitskaya by armbar submission in the first round on November 18, 2016. The loss was controversial because the referee told her to move from a legal position which may have led directly to the submission. Evinger appealed her loss and on December 1, 2016 the loss was changed to a no contest, so Evinger retained her title.

Evinger faced Kunitskaya in a rematch in the main event of Invicta FC 22 on March 25, 2017. She won the fight by submission in the second round to retain her title.

Ultimate Fighting Championship 
On June 27, 2017, it was announced that Evinger had signed with the UFC and was set to face Cris Cyborg for the vacant UFC Women's Featherweight Championship at UFC 214. She lost the fight by TKO in the third round.

Evinger was scheduled to face Marion Reneau at UFC Fight Night: Cowboy vs. Medeiros in Austin, Texas, Texas on February 18, 2018. However, on January 9, 2018,  she was forced to pull out fight, citing injury.

Evinger was scheduled to face Ketlen Vieira on September 22, 2018 at UFC Fight Night 137. However, on August 7, 2018, Vieira pulled out due to a knee injury. In turn, Evinger was pulled from the card and scheduled to face Aspen Ladd two weeks later at UFC 229. She lost the fight via TKO in the first round.

Evinger faced Lina Länsberg on June 1, 2019  at UFC Fight Night 153. She lost the fight by unanimous decision and was subsequently released from the promotion.

Championships and accomplishments
 Invicta Fighting Championships
 Invicta FC Bantamweight Champion (One time)
 Two successful title defenses vs. Colleen Schneider and Yana Kunitskaya
Performance of the Night (Two times) vs. Ediane Gomes and Pannie Kianzad

Mixed martial arts record

|Loss
|align=center|19–8 (1)
|Lina Länsberg
|Decision (unanimous)
|UFC Fight Night: Gustafsson vs. Smith 
|
|align=center|3
|align=center|5:00
|Stockholm, Sweden
|
|-
|Loss
|align=center|19–7 (1)
|Aspen Ladd
|TKO (punches)
|UFC 229 
|
|align=center|1
|align=center|3:26
|Las Vegas, Nevada, United States
|
|-
|Loss
|align=center|19–6 (1)
|Cris Cyborg
|TKO (knees)
|UFC 214
|
|align=center|3
|align=center|1:56
|Anaheim, California, United States
|
|-
| Win
| align=center | 19–5 (1)
| Yana Kunitskaya
| Submission (rear-naked choke)
| Invicta FC 22: Evinger vs. Kunitskaya II
| 
| align=center | 2
| align=center | 4:32
| Kansas City, Missouri, United States
| 
|-
|  NC
| align=center | 18–5 (1)
| Yana Kunitskaya
| NC (overturned)
| Invicta FC 20: Evinger vs. Kunitskaya
| 
| align=center | 1
| align=center | 1:59
| Kansas City, Missouri, United States
| 
|-
| Win
| align=center | 18–5
| Colleen Schneider
| Decision (unanimous)
| Invicta FC 17: Evinger vs. Schneider
| 
| align=center | 5
| align=center | 5:00
| Costa Mesa, California, United States
| 
|-
| Win
| align=center | 17–5
| Pannie Kianzad
| TKO (punches)
| Invicta FC 14: Evinger vs. Kianzad
| 
| align=center | 2
| align=center | 3:34
| Kansas City, Missouri, United States
|
|-
| Win
| align=center | 16–5
| Irene Aldana
| TKO (punches)
| Invicta FC 13: Cyborg vs. Van Duin
| 
| align=center | 4
| align=center | 4:38
| Las Vegas, Nevada, United States
| 
|-
| Win
| align=center | 15–5
| Cindy Dandois
| Submission (armbar)
| Invicta FC 10: Waterson vs. Tiburcio
| 
| align=center | 2
| align=center | 1:23
| Houston, Texas, United States
|
|-
| Win
| align=center | 14–5
| Ediane Gomes
| Submission (armbar)
| Invicta FC 8: Waterson vs. Tamada
| 
| align=center | 1
| align=center | 3:31
| Kansas City, Missouri, United States
| 
|-
| Win
| align=center | 13–5
| Sarah D'Alelio
| Decision (unanimous)
| Invicta FC 7: Honchak vs. Smith
| 
| align=center | 3
| align=center | 5:00
| Kansas City, Missouri, United States
| 
|-
| Win
| align=center | 12–5
| Carina Damm
| Decision (split)
| Fight Hard MMA
| 
| align=center | 3
| align=center | 5:00
| St. Charles, Missouri, United States
| 
|-
| Win
| align=center | 11–5
| Lacie Jackson
| KO (punch)
| Fight Me MMA
| 
| align=center | 1
| align=center | 1:47
| St. Charles, Missouri, United States
|
|-
| Win
| align=center | 10–5
| Anita Rodriguez
| Submission (rear-naked choke)
| XFL: Rumble on the River 5
| 
| align=center | 1
| align=center | 1:57
| Tulsa, Oklahoma, United States
|
|-
| Loss
| align=center | 9–5
| Sara McMann
| Decision (unanimous)
| Titan FC 19
| 
| align=center | 3
| align=center | 5:00
| Kansas City, Kansas, United States
|
|-
| Loss
| align=center | 9–4
| Alexis Davis
| Submission (rear-naked choke)
| RW 10: Mayhem in the Mist 5
| 
| align=center | 1
| align=center | 1:25
| Niagara Falls, New York, United States
| 
|-
| Win
| align=center | 9–3
| Adrienna Jenkins
| TKO (punches)
| RW 8: Cage Supremacy
| 
| align=center | 2
| align=center | 3:16
| Salamanca, New York, United States
|
|-
| Loss
| align=center | 8–3
| Alexis Davis
| Submission (rear-naked choke)
| RW 7: Mayhem in the Mist 3
| 
| align=center | 3
| align=center | 1:47
| Niagara Falls, New York, United States
| 
|-
| Win
| align=center | 8–2
| Sarah Schneider
| Decision (unanimous)
| True Fight Fans
| 
| align=center | 3
| align=center | 5:00
| Missouri, United States
|
|-
| Win
| align=center | 7–2
| Julie Kedzie
| Submission (rear-naked choke)
| ShoXC: Elite Challenger Series
| 
| align=center | 1
| align=center | 1:43
| Atlantic City, New Jersey, United States
|
|-
| Win
| align=center | 6–2
| Katrine Alendal
| Submission (armbar)
| PFP: Ring of Fire
| 
| align=center | 1
| align=center | N/A
| Manila, Philippines
|
|-
| Loss
| align=center | 5–2
| Gina Carano
| Submission (rear-naked choke)
| EliteXC: Uprising
| 
| align=center | 1
| align=center | 2:53
| Honolulu, Hawaii, United States
|
|-
| Loss
| align=center | 5–1
| Vanessa Porto
| Submission (armbar)
| FFF 2: Girls Night Out
| 
| align=center | 1
| align=center | 2:14
| Compton, California, United States
|
|-
| Win
| align=center | 5–0
| Ginele Marquez
| Submission (rear-naked choke)
| Tuff-N-Uff 2
| 
| align=center | 3
| align=center | 1:58
| Las Vegas, Nevada, United States
|
|-
| Win
| align=center | 4–0
| Shonie Plagmann
| KO (punch)
| X-1: Extreme Fighting 2
| 
| align=center | 2
| align=center | 0:10
| Honolulu, Hawaii, United States
|
|-
| Win
| align=center | 3–0
| Angela Hayes
| TKO (punches)
| Kick Enterprises
| 
| align=center | 1
| align=center | 1:02
| Ft. Myers, Florida, United States
|
|-
| Win
| align=center | 2–0
| Brittany Pullen
| KO (punch)
| FFF 1: Asian Invasion
| 
| align=center | 1
| align=center | 0:16
| Los Angeles, California, United States
|
|-
| win
| align=center | 1–0
| Brittany Pullen
| KO (punches)
| IFC: Warriors Challenge 21
| 
| align=center | 2
| align=center | 1:56
| Tuolumne, California, United States
|

|-
| Loss
| align=center | 0–1
| Raquel Pennington
| Submission (guillotine choke)
| The Ultimate Fighter: Team Rousey vs. Team Tate
| 
| align=center | 2
| align=center | 
| Las Vegas, Nevada, United States
| Preliminary bout.

See also
 List of female mixed martial artists

References

External links
 
 

1981 births
Living people
American female mixed martial artists
Flyweight mixed martial artists
Bantamweight mixed martial artists
Mixed martial artists utilizing boxing
Mixed martial artists utilizing wrestling
Lesbian sportswomen
LGBT people from Missouri
American LGBT sportspeople
LGBT mixed martial artists
Featherweight mixed martial artists
People from Odessa, Missouri
American people of German descent
Ultimate Fighting Championship female fighters
21st-century American women